Blair Braverman (born 1988) is an American adventurer, dogsled racer, musher, advice columnist and nonfiction writer. She raced and completed the 2019 Iditarod, the  dogsled race from Anchorage to Nome, Alaska.

In 2016, the Outdoor Industry Association selected Braverman as one of Outdoor 30 Under 30 list and Publishers Weekly called Braverman a "21st century feminist reincarnation of Jack London."

Background
Braverman was born on May 7, 1988, the daughter of research scientist Jana Kay Slater and university professor and author Marc Braverman.  She was raised Jewish in California's Central Valley.  When she was ten, her family moved for a year to Norway for her father's research on the country's comprehensive smoking ban. Braverman attended local schools.

Returning to Davis, California, Braverman finished her schooling, including a term as an exchange student in Lillehammer, Norway. Spending summers at Camp Tawonga, a Jewish camp near Yosemite, she later attended a Scandinavian folk school in Mortenhals, a traditional one-year trade program, and studied dogsledding and winter survival. She returned to the United States in 2007, graduating from Colby College in 2011. While in school, she had articles published locally and nationally, in magazines and newspapers. She also spent two summers working as a dogsled guide on a glacier in Alaska.

Braverman later earned a Master of Fine Arts in creative nonfiction at the University of Iowa, where she was also an Arts Fellow. She has been resident Fellow at Blue Mountain Center and the MacDowell Colony.

She lives with her partner, Quince Mountain, in Mountain, Wisconsin.

Adventure and writing career
In 2016, Braverman published Welcome to the Goddamn Ice Cube, a memoir of her childhood and northern adventures as well as a study of the ways men and women cope with harsh environments — and each other. Braverman discussed the perils not only from blizzards, isolation and wild animals, but also from sexism and violence faced by women adventurers in a male-dominated field — distinguishing the memoir from travel narratives and self-discovery memoirs. At the book's introduction, Publishers Weekly called Braverman the "21st-century feminist reincarnation of Jack London" and the book was recommended by O, The Oprah Magazine.

She has also written articles exploring gender, trans issues, and online harassment. She is a contributing editor for Outside Magazine, with a regular advice column called "Tough Love" dealing with relationships and the outdoors. Braverman's work has also appeared in The Atavist, BuzzFeed,  and the Smithsonian, among others.

Braverman has operated a kennel. She trained for the 2018 Iditarod and completed the 2019 Iditarod, finishing 36th. She was only the second Jewish woman to have completed the race.

Media appearances

In 2015, Braverman was featured on the public radio show This American Life as part of the episode "Game Face."

Braverman appeared on a special episode of Discovery's Naked and Afraid in 2019, an experience she wrote about in detail for Outside. Also in 2019, she was a guest on The Today Show. After her appearance, Harry Smith continued to follow her Iditarod Trail Sled Dog Race effort; and the following week he featured a spot about of her team, who raised over $100,000 for Alaska public schools during a campaign called #igivearod. The campaign continues to raise funds for causes in rural Alaska each year.

In 2021, she appeared on the New York Times Sway podcast, where she and host Kara Swisher discussed survival and resilience.

References 

1988 births
Living people
Writers from California
American dog mushers
American women journalists
American advice columnists
21st-century American women writers
Colby College alumni
University of Iowa alumni
American non-fiction outdoors writers
21st-century American non-fiction writers
Jewish women writers
Jewish American non-fiction writers